Pełcznica is a river of Poland, a tributary of the Strzegomka.

The Pełcznica River is located in Lower Silesia, and is the largest tributary of the Strzegomka, 39 km. in length. The source of the river begins above Walbrzych, in the Wałbrzych Mountains, on the northern slopes of the Sylvan Massif, near the old Glinik. It is about 450 meters above sea level, flows through Walbrzych and Świebodzice.

The Walbrzych segment is partially channeled and flows under the city, visible on the surface only from the Old Spa district. Between Wałbrzych and Świebodzicami, the river creates an important element of Książański Landscape Park. It flows into Strzegomka, near the village Skarżyce as its right tributary.

Larger tributaries of the river are the streams: Sobięcinka, Poniatówka, Lubiechowski Potok and Szczawnik.
Currently the water from Pełcznica varies from I to III grade purity. The river is heavily polluted with sludge from sedimentation tanks and flotation coal coking at Walbrzych mines. An old sewage works nearby is also pumping raw sewage into the river when sewage volumes get too much for the old pumping system. You can view the river discolourisation from pollution as being a heavy dark brown giving off a slight chemical odour. The source of the pollution is near Legnicka Road, where the polytechnic college is situated (Politechnika Wrocławska w Wałbrzychu). The pollution being pumped into the river has killed off all living life in and around the river.

Rivers of Poland
Rivers of Lower Silesian Voivodeship